Iceberg Interactive is a privately held video game publisher based in Haarlem, Netherlands. The company is known for publishing games of independent developers. It publishes video games for Windows, macOS, and Linux through traditional retail channels as well as digital distribution services, such as Steam. In recent years Iceberg Interactive has also published games for consoles, including Xbox and PlayStation.

Overview 
Iceberg Interactive was founded in 2009 and is responsible for publishing more than 60 titles including games such as Endless Space, Killing Floor and StarDrive.

The company supports development studios by offering quality assurance, translation and product localization, distribution, public relations and marketing. In the last couple of years Iceberg Interactive has shifted its main focus from retail to digital distribution.

Games published

References

External links

Dutch companies established in 2009
Video game publishers
Video game companies established in 2009
Video game companies of the Netherlands
Haarlem
Companies based in North Holland
Privately held companies of the Netherlands